Great Road or The Great Road may refer to:

 Great Road (Roman Britain), another name for the part of Pye Road between Londinium (London) and Camulodunum (Colchester) in Roman Britain
 Great Road (New England), a historic road from Rhode Island to Connecticut in the United States
 Great Road Historic District in Lincoln, Rhode Island, commemorating the former road
 Great Wagon Road, a historic road from Pennsylvania to North Carolina in the United States
 Great Road (Appalachia), another name for the Wilderness Road across the Appalachians through the Cumberland Gap in the United States

See also
 Great East Road in Zambia